An adding machine is a form of calculator.

Adding machine  may also refer to:
 The Adding Machine, 1923 play by Elmer Rice
 The Adding Machine (film), 1969 film based on the play
 Adding Machine (musical), 2007 musical based on the play
 The Adding Machine: Collected Essays, collection of writings by William S. Burroughs
 The von Neumann–Kakutani adding machine, a special case of a generic adding machine in ergodic theory.